The Curtis Formation is a geologic formation in Utah. It preserves fossils dating back to the Callovian age of the Jurassic period.

Description 

The Curtis Formation is composed of shallow marine sandstone, with thin beds of mudstone and minor limestone and gypsum. The sandstone is grayish-green in color and flat bedded or cross bedded. The presence of glauconite and marine invertebrate fossils indicates it was laid down in a shallow marine environment that became hypersaline towards the end of deposition. It represents a high stand of the Sundance Sea in the Callovian.

History of investigation 
The formation was first described by Gilluly and Reeside in 1928 and named for exposures in the northeast San Rafael Reef at Curtis Point. Pipiringos and Imlay reassigned the Curtis as a member of the Stump Formation in 1979, but this was rejected by Peterson in 1988.

Footnotes

See also

 List of fossiliferous stratigraphic units in Utah
 Paleontology in Utah

References
 
 
 
 

Jurassic geology of Utah